Thomas Teehan (24 March 1904 - 21 September 1992) was an Irish hurler who played as a right corner-back for the Dublin senior hurling team.

References

1904 births
1992 deaths
Dublin inter-county hurlers
All-Ireland Senior Hurling Championship winners